Meyer Shapiro may refer to: 

Meir Shapiro, dean of Chachmei Lublin Yeshiva, and founder of the Daf Yomi Talmud folio cycle
Meyer Shapiro, one of the Shapiro Brothers, New York City labor racketeer
Meyer Schapiro, art historian